The water skiing and wakeboarding competitions at the 2017 Southeast Asian Games took place at Water Sports Complex, Putrajaya.

Medal table

Medalists

Water skiing

Wakeboarding

References

External links
 

2017 Southeast Asian Games events
South
2017